The events of 1987 in anime.

Releases

See also
1987 in animation

References

External links 
Japanese animated works of the year, listed in the IMDb

Anime
Anime
Years in anime